BHM is a three-letter acronym with several meanings:

 Black History Month
 Backwoods Home Magazine
 Bambang Harymurti, an Indonesian journalist also known by his initials
 Birmingham New Street railway station in Birmingham, England
 Birmingham-Shuttlesworth International Airport (IATA code) in Birmingham, Alabama, USA
 Big Handsome Men
 Bulletin of the History of Medicine